The Ward Motor Vehicle Company was founded by Charles A. Ward in New York City as an electric truck company.  When Hayden Eames joined the company, it made electric cars also, from 1914-1916.

Models 

The Ward Electric car was a four passenger coupe costing $2,100 and went 100 miles per charge.  In 1916, the price was $875. The battery was an Edison battery. In 1916, the price was dropped to $1,295. The company stopped electric car production after 1916. It continued to make trucks until 1937.

References 

Sources

Web
  (earlyelectric.com)
 
Books
 
 

Defunct motor vehicle manufacturers of the United States